The National Environment Management Authority of Uganda (NEMA), is a government agency responsible for the monitoring, coordinating, supervising and regulating the natural environment and the environmental policy of Uganda. NEMA advises the government of Uganda and spearheads the development of environmental policies, regulations, laws, guidelines and standards.

Location
The headquarters of NEMA are located at 17/19/21 Jinja Road, in the Central Division of the city of Kampala, Uganda's capital and largest city. The geographical coordinates of the NEMA headquarters are: 00°18'51.0"N, 32°35'24.0"E (Latitude:0.314167; Laitude:32.590000).

Overview
NEMA was established in May 1995 under the National Environment Act Cap 153 and became operational in December 1995. It is administered under the Uganda Ministry of Water and Environment.

Governance
The agency is supervised by a nine-person board of directors, headed by a chairperson, currently Sandy Stevens Tickodri-Togboa. Other members of the board include Pricilla Nyandoi, Pascal Musoli, Julian Komuhangi, Elly Sabiiti, James Lutalo, William Ndoleriire, Gideon Bagadawa and Beatrice Byarugaba. Dr Priscilla Nyadoi serves as the Deputy chairperson, and Tom Okurut, is the Executive Director of the agency.

See also
 Environmental management
 National Environment Management Authority of Kenya

References

External links
 National Environment Management Authority

Environmental organisations based in Uganda
Environment
Organisations based in Kampala
Organizations established in 1995
1995 establishments in Uganda